Eleven ships of the French Navy have borne the name Sibylle:

Ships named Sybille 
 , a six-gun frigate 
 , a 6-gun corvette 
 , a 6-gun corvette 
 , a 12-gun frigate 
  (1729), a barque
 , a 32-gun frigate, lead ship of her class 
 , a 38-gun 
 , a 40-gun frigate 
 , a 50-gun frigate 
 , a 
 , a British S-class submarine loaned in 1952 and lost eleven weeks later

See also

Notes and references
Notes

References

Bibliography
 
 

French Navy ship names